The Cameron Handicap is a Newcastle Jockey Club  Group 3 Thoroughbred open handicap horse race over a distance of 1,500 metres, held at Broadmeadow Racecourse in Newcastle, New South Wales, Australia in September. Total prize money for the race is A$200,000.

History

Grade
 Prior to 2005 – Listed race
 2005 onwards – Group 3

Distance
 Prior to 2009 – 1300 metres
 2009–2010 – 1400 metres
 2011–2015 – 1500 metres
 2016 – 1350 metres
 2017 onwards – 1500 metres

Name
 Named after James George Cameron for lifelong dedication to Newcastle racing.

Winners

 2022 - Wild Chap
 2021 - Ashman  
 2020 - Rock
 2019 – Rock
 2018 – New Tipperary
 2017 – Got Unders
 2016 – Chetwood
 2015 – Forget
 2014 – Hooked
 2013 – Toydini
 2012 – Rolling Pin
 2011 – Raspberries
 2010 – Kenny's World
 2009 – Absolutelyfabulous
 2008 – Raheeb
 2007 – race not held
 2006 – Court's In Session
 2005 – Collate
 2004 – Osca Warrior
 2003 – Archave
 2002 – Excellerator
 2001 – Kingsgate
 2000 – Mulan Princess
 1999 – Anthems
 1998 – Adam
 1997 – Crows Before Dawn
 1996 – Cohort
 1995 – Yarradorf
 1994 – Social Rule
 1993 – Flitter
 1992 – Brihuego
 1991 – Quick Score
 1990 – Cheval Cavalier
 1989 – Don't Play
 1988 – Windsor's Pal
 1987 – Full Page
 1986 – Sound Of Bells
 1985 – Regal Value
 1984 – Almerzo
 1983 – Tandrio
 1982 – Manuan
 1981 – Paradise Plumes
 1980 – Captain Cadet
 1979 – Romantic Dream
 1978 – Manawapoi
 1977 – Luskin Star

See also
 List of Australian Group races
 Group races

References

 Australian Studbook – NJC Cameron Handicap Race Winners
 

Horse races in Australia
Sport in Newcastle, New South Wales